The Castle of Velasco is a 14th-century castle in Valle de Mena, Burgos, Spain. The medieval castle has been restored and is privately owned. The Spanish government classifies the fortification as a site of cultural interest.

References

External links 

News article (in Spanish) detailing the preservation of the castle

Bien de Interés Cultural landmarks in the Province of Burgos
14th-century establishments in Spain
Castles in Spain